Clark Township is one of the twenty one townships of Tama County, Iowa, United States.

History
Clark Township was organized in 1860.

In 1882, Clark Township was named in honor of Judge Leander Clark.

References

Townships in Tama County, Iowa
Townships in Iowa